General Lea may refer to:

Albert Miller Lea (1808–1891), Iowa Militia brigadier general
George Lea (British Army officer) (1912–1990), British Army lieutenant general
Homer Lea (1876–1912), lieutenant general in the military forces of Chinese revolutionary Bao Huang Hui